The lesser mouse-deer, lesser Malay chevrotain, or kanchil (Tragulus kanchil) is a species of even-toed ungulate in the family Tragulidae.

Distribution

The lesser mouse-deer is found widely across Southeast Asia in Indochina, Myanmar (Kra Isthmus), Brunei, Cambodia, China (Southern Yunnan), Indonesia (Kalimantan, Sumatra and many other small islands), Laos, Malaysia (Peninsular Malaysia, Sarawak and many other small islands), Singapore, Thailand, and Vietnam.

Description
It is one of the smallest known hoofed mammals, its mature size being as little as 45 cm (18 inches) and 2 kg (4.4 lb) and related to the even smaller Java mouse-deer. It is threatened by predation by feral dogs.

Through further research it is also discovered that the creatures who were initially believed to be nocturnal actually conduct their activities during the day. As discovered by Kusuda, the first being that though many births occur in May, November or December, the females are able to reproduce throughout the year (Kusuda et al).

Folklore

In Indonesian and Malaysian folklore, the mouse-deer Sang Kancil is a cunning trickster similar to Br'er Rabbit from the Uncle Remus tales, even sharing some story plots. For instance, they both trick enemies pretending to be dead or inanimate, and both lose a race to slower opponents.

References

 Mammal Species of the World

Kusuda, S., Adachi, I., Fujioka, K., Nakamura, M., Amano-Hanzawa, N., Goto, N., et al. (2013). Reproductive characteristics of female lesser mouse deers (tragulus javanicus) based on fecal progestogens and breeding records. Animal Reproduction Science, 137(1-2), 69-73. doi:10.1016/j.anireprosci.2012.12.008

Tragulus
Mammals of Brunei
Mammals of Cambodia
Mammals of China
Mammals of Indonesia
Mammals of Laos
Mammals of Malaysia
Mammals of Myanmar
Mammals of Singapore
Mammals of Thailand
Mammals of Vietnam
Mammals of Borneo
Mammals described in 1821
Taxa named by Thomas Stamford Raffles